Roffe or Roffé is a surname. Notable people with the name include:

Carlos Roffé (1943–2005), Argentine film and television actor
Diann Roffe (born 1967), American alpine ski racer and Olympic gold medalist
Reina Roffé (born 1951),  Argentine writer
Tatiana Garmash-Roffe, Russian writer

Other
Roffe engraving families of London

See also
Roff (disambiguation)
Ruffe, a species of freshwater fish